Čohodari (Cyrillic: Чоходари) is a village in the municipality of Cazin, Bosnia and Herzegovina.

References 

Populated places in Cazin